Charles Andrew Willoughby (March 8, 1892 – October 25, 1972) was a major general in the U.S. Army, serving as General Douglas MacArthur's chief of intelligence during most of World War II and the Korean War.

Early life and education

Willoughby is often quoted as being born March 8, 1892, in Heidelberg, Germany, as  Adolph Karl Weidenbach, the son of Baron T. Tscheppe-Weidenbach and wife Emma Willoughby Tscheppe-Weidenbach of Baltimore, Maryland. This was disputed by Frank Kluckhohn of The Reporter (New York Journal) in 1952, and there remains uncertainty as to both his birth name and lineage.

It is certain, however, that Willoughby emigrated from Germany to the US in 1910, and in October 1910 he enlisted in the U.S. Army, where he served with the 5th Infantry, initially as a private, later rising to the rank of sergeant. He was honorably discharged from the army in 1913.

He then entered Gettysburg College as a senior in 1913 based on his attestations of three years of attendance at the University of Heidelberg and the Sorbonne in Paris before he emigrated to the United States. Although he graduated with a B.A. in 1914, it is disputed whether or not he actually did attend either European university.

After graduation from Gettysburg College, Willoughby was commissioned a second lieutenant in the Officers' Volunteer Reserve Corps of the US Army in 1914.  He spent three years teaching German and military studies (while serving as a reserve US Army officer) at various prep-schools in the United States. In August 1916, he vacated his position in the reserve to accept a Regular Army commission as a second lieutenant under the name Adolph Charles Weidenbach. He rose to Captain and served in World War I in the American Expeditionary Force.

He changed his name at some point between 1910 and 1930 to Charles Andrew Willoughby (a loose translation of Weidenbach, the German for "willow brook"). During his early life, he became fluent in English, Spanish, German, French, and later, Japanese.

World War I

Using the name Adolf Charles Weidenbach, Willoughby was commissioned as a second lieutenant in the Regular Army on 27 November 1916, and promoted to first lieutenant on the same day. He joined the American Expeditionary Force (AEF) in June 1917 and was promoted to captain (permanent) on 30 June 1917, serving initially with the 16th Infantry Regiment (United States), First Division. He later transferred to the US Army Air Corps, where he was trained as a pilot by the French military.

Post World War I
After the war, Captain Willoughby/Weidenbach joined the 24th Infantry in New Mexico in 1919. He spent two years at his post before being posted to San Juan, Puerto Rico. He became involved in military intelligence while in San Juan. While serving in Puerto Rico he married Juana Manuela Rodríguez Umpierre who bore him a daughter, Olga. He had served as a Military Attaché in Ecuador. He received the Order of Saints Maurice and Lazarus from Benito Mussolini's Fascist Italian government. In the 1920s Willoughby was an admirer of Spanish General and future dictator Francisco Franco, calling him the "second greatest general in the world". He met him in Morocco and then delivered a speech to him at a lunch in Madrid.  He was toasted by the Secretary General of the Falangist Party.

In 1929, Willoughby was assigned to Command and General Staff College at Fort Leavenworth, Kansas as a student and in 1931 as an instructor.  In 1936, Major Willoughby was promoted to lieutenant colonel.

World War II and the occupation of Japan

Willoughby was the Chief of Intelligence on General MacArthur's staff during World War II, the occupation of Japan, and the Korean War. In Australia, Willoughby was not allowed to be present at the daily intelligence briefings given to MacArthur by USN codebreaker Rudy Fabian, see Central Bureau.

Willoughby became a major general on 12 April 1945. Due to his initiative at the end of the Pacific Campaign war crimes charges against Shirō Ishii were dispensed with in exchange for information gathered by Unit 731, a covert biological and chemical warfare research and development unit of the Imperial Japanese Army that undertook lethal human experimentation in China.  Additionally there was a monetary reward for Ishii.

In Japan, Willoughby was assigned the head of the G-2 in Supreme Commander for the Allied Powers (SCAP), which was mainly in charge of intelligence and enforcing SCAPIN-33 (Press code for Japan) for censorship of the Japanese press. Under his administration numerous alleged Japanese war criminals such as Yoshio Kodama and Masanobu Tsuji were rehabilitated and recruited.

Paranoidly anti-communist, Willoughby claimed without basis that there was a "leftist infiltration" of the GHQ, and he went out of his way to track and discredit thinkers left of himself. Willoughby investigated New Dealers in Charles Louis Kades in GHQ's Government Section, an endeavor that included blacklisting economist Eleanor Hadley such that she could not obtain a steady government job in the United States for seventeen years, and he ordered Japanese police to secretly spy on occupation officials. He even meddled in Japanese domestic politics, bringing down the Democrat–Socialist–People's Cooperative coalition government  led by Hitoshi Ashida. According to declassified 2005 CIA documents Willoughby organized a group of ultranationalists including Hideaki Tojo's former secretary Takushiro Hattori in 1952 to assassinate then-prime minister Shigeru Yoshida. He was to be replaced with Ichirō Hatoyama who was much more hawkish and eager to re-militarize Japan. The plan was aborted after potential support within the National Safety Agency dried up. The CIA report describes both coup members as "extremely irresponsible," Tsuji in particular is characterized as "the type of man who, given the chance, would start World War III without any misgivings."

According to Seagraves, Willoughby was briefed by Edward Lansdale in Tokyo about the "Golden Lily", 'M-Fund', or Yamashita's gold.

Korean War 
Willoughby's contribution during the Korean War is subject to some significant controversy, with several sources insisting that he intentionally distorted, if not out and out suppressed, intelligence estimates that showed the Chinese were massing at the Yalu River. Willoughby allegedly did so in order to better support MacArthur's (mistaken) assertion that the Chinese would never cross the Yalu, and thus allow MacArthur a freer hand in his drive to the Yalu.

MacArthur affectionately referred to him as "my pet fascist." Willoughby's "vitriolic, paranoid, and frequently fantastic" notes included antisemitic insults towards Beate Sirota Gordon, who helped write the Constitution of Japan. During World War II MacArthur said, "There have been three great intelligence officers in history. Mine is not one of them."  John Ferris in his 2007 book Intelligence and Strategy calls this an "understatement" and calls Willoughby a "candidate for one of the three worst intelligence officers of the Second World War" (p. 261).

Writer David Halberstam, in his book The Coldest Winter, paints Willoughby as largely having been appointed head of intelligence for Korea due to his sycophancy toward MacArthur. He points out that many veterans of the war, both enlisted and otherwise, felt that the lack of correct intelligence regarding the Chinese presence resulted in poor preparation by field commanders. This also contributed to MacArthur's desire to push his upper level commanders to divide their commands, making mutual support of units and fortifications inadequate for the large numbers of Chinese they were about to face.

As said of Willoughby, by Lieutenant Colonel John Chiles, 10th Corps G-3, or chief of operations of that unit.

MacArthur did not want the Chinese to enter the war in Korea. Anything MacArthur wanted, Willoughby produced intelligence for.… In this case Willoughby falsified the intelligence reports.… He should have gone to jail...

Other activities
Willoughby was involved in the creation of Field Operations Intelligence, a top secret Army Intelligence unit that later came under joint military and Central Intelligence Agency control.

Willoughby allegedly organized an assassination, instead of a coup d'etat, against Shigeru Yoshida in early 1950s Japan involving ultranationalists Masanobu Tsuji and Takushiro Hattori.

Retirement, death and legacy
Willoughby retired from the Army on August 31, 1951. After his retirement, Willoughby travelled to Spain to act as an advisor and lobbyist for dictator Francisco Franco. In his later years, Willoughby published the Foreign Intelligence Digest newspaper, and worked closely with Texas oil tycoon H. L. Hunt on the International Committee for the Defence of Christian Culture, an extreme right "umbrella" organization that had connections to anti-Communist groups.   Another one of Willoughby's allies was the Rev. Billy James Hargis.  In 1968, Willoughby moved with his wife to Naples, Florida.

Charles A. Willoughby died on 25 October 1972 and was buried at Arlington National Cemetery. He is a member of the Military Intelligence Hall of Fame.

Dates of rank

Decorations and medals
Willoughby received numerous military decorations and medals, including:

Published works
Articles
 "America Needs a Foreign Legion!" Argosy (Jan. 1966).

Books
 Guerrilla Resistance Movement in the Philippines, 1941–1945. New York: Vantage (1972).
 MacArthur, 1941–1951. New York: McGraw-Hill (1954).
 Shanghai Conspiracy: The Sorge Spy Ring, Moscow, Shanghai, Tokyo, San Francisco, New York. Preface by General Douglas MacArthur. New York: Dutton (1952); Boston: Western Islands (1965).
 Intelligence Series: G-2 USAFFE, SWPA, AFPAC, FEC, SCAP. Washington, D.C.: Government Printing Office (1948).
 Campaigns of MacArthur in the Pacific
 Japanese Operations Against MacArthur
 MacArthur in Japan: Military Phases (undated)
 Written by Willoughby and a team of American and Japanese military commanders after World War II. Intended to be the basis for General MacArthur's memoirs, the final version disappeared after President Truman dismissed MacArthur. No copy has turned up in either MacArthur's or Willoughby's papers.

In popular culture 
General Willoughby is frequently mentioned in author W. E. B. Griffin's series "The Corps", usually in an unflattering light.

Willoughby appears frequently as one of MacArthur's key advisors in James Webb's historical novel The Emperor's General.

See also 
 Korea Liaison Office

General bibliography 
 Papers of Major General Charles A. Willoughby, USA 1947-1973
 Campbell, Kenneth J. "Major General Charles A. Willoughby: A Mixed Performance". Text of unpublished paper.

Citations

External links
Generals of World War II
Major General Charles Willoughby Papers at Gettysburg College

1892 births
1972 deaths
United States Army generals
United States Army personnel of World War I
United States Army personnel of the Korean War
Recipients of the Silver Star
Recipients of the Distinguished Service Cross (United States)
Recipients of the Distinguished Service Medal (US Army)
Recipients of the Distinguished Service Star
Recipients of the Legion of Merit
Grand Officers of the Order of Orange-Nassau
Commanders of the Order of Saints Maurice and Lazarus
20th-century American military personnel
United States military attachés
Gettysburg College alumni
Burials at Arlington National Cemetery
German emigrants to the United States
American conspiracy theorists
Far-right politics in the United States
United States Army generals of World War II